Tomasz Grzegorz Wójtowicz (22 September 1953 – 24 October 2022) was a Polish volleyball player. In his later life, he worked as a volleyball commentator. As a member of the Poland national team, he won the titles of the 1976 Olympic Champion and the 1974 World Champion.  

Wójtowicz was considered one of the first volleyball players in the world to start attacking from the back row. In 2001, he was listed by the International Volleyball Federation as one of the top eight volleyball players in the world. In 2002, he became the first Polish volleyball player to be inducted into the Volleyball Hall of Fame.

Wójtowicz died after a long illness on 24 October 2022, at the age of 69.

Honours

Clubs
 CEV European Champions Cup 
  1984/1985 – with Santal Parma
  1985/1986 – with Santal Parma
 National championships
 1982/1983  Polish Championship, with Legia Warsaw

Youth national team
 1971  CEV U20 European Championship

Individual awards
 1977: FIVB World Cup – Most Valuable Player
 1977: FIVB World Cup – Best Blocker

State awards
 2021:  Commander's Cross of Polonia Restituta

References

External links

 
 
 Player profile at LegaVolley.it 
 Player profile at Volleyhall.org
 Player profile at Volleybox.net

1953 births
2022 deaths
Sportspeople from Lublin
Polish men's volleyball players
Olympic volleyball players of Poland
Volleyball players at the 1976 Summer Olympics
Volleyball players at the 1980 Summer Olympics
Olympic medalists in volleyball
Olympic gold medalists for Poland
Medalists at the 1976 Summer Olympics
Polish expatriate sportspeople in Italy
Expatriate volleyball players in Italy
Legia Warsaw (volleyball) players